The 2010 Triple J Hottest 100 was announced and played on Australia Day, 26 January 2011. It is the eighteenth countdown of the most popular songs of the year, as chosen by the listeners of Australian radio station Triple J.

Voting commenced at midnight on Monday 20 December 2010, and closed at midnight on Sunday 16 January 2011. 1.26 million votes were recorded from 152 countries, a new record number of votes.

The #1 spot belonged to "Big Jet Plane" by Angus & Julia Stone. Besides the table below, the whole top 100 can be viewed here.

The full list of places #101–200 can be viewed here.

Full list

Artists with multiple entries
Three entries
 Birds of Tokyo (4, 47, 87)
 Mark Ronson & The Business Intl (10, 17, 35)
 Pendulum (11, 48, 69)
 Washington (20, 59, 84)
 Bliss n Eso (23, 41, 53)
 Gorillaz (37, 42, 78)
 Arcade Fire (58, 63, 83)
 Gypsy & The Cat (64, 71, 73)

Two entries
 Angus & Julia Stone (1, 62)
 Little Red (2, 79)
 Ou Est Le Swimming Pool (3, 61)
 Boy & Bear (5, 45)
 Art vs. Science (9, 90)
 Sia (13, 56)
 Kanye West (14, 88)
 The Jezabels (16, 49)
 Two Door Cinema Club (21, 72)
 Children Collide (22, 60)
 Crystal Castles (26, 44)
 Yeasayer (30, 51)
 The National (31, 93)
 Tame Impala (33, 74)
 The Naked and Famous (34, 38)
 Hot Chip (50, 85)
 Vampire Weekend (55, 67)
 Dead Letter Circus (65, 99)
 The Black Keys (80, 82)

Countries represented
 Australia – 51
 United States – 24
 United Kingdom – 21
 Canada – 5
 New Zealand – 2
 Iceland – 1
 Sweden – 1

Top 20 Albums of 2010
Triple J Listeners voted for their favorite album of 2010 in a similar format to the Hottest 100. Voters were allowed to vote for any album released in 2010 and were limited to ten votes.

Bold indicates the winner of the Hottest 100, while Tame Impala's Innerspeaker won the J Award.

CD Release

DVD release
 Angus & Julia Stone - Big Jet Plane
 Little Red - Rock It
 Ou Est Le Swimming Pool - Dance the Way I Feel
 Birds of Tokyo - Plans
 Adrian Lux - Teenage Crime
 Cee-Lo Green - Fuck You
 The Wombats - Tokyo (Vampires & Wolves)
 Art vs. Science - Magic Fountain
 Mark Ronson & the Business Intl - Somebody to Love Me
 Drapht - Rapunzel
 Sia - Clap Your Hands
 Duck Sauce - Barbra Streisand
 The Jezabels - Mace Spray
 Cloud Control - There's Nothing in the Water We Can't Fight
 Flight Facilities Featuring Giselle - Crave You
 Washington - Sunday Best
 Two Door Cinema Club - Undercover Martyn 
 Children Collide - Jellylegs
 Bliss n Eso - Addicted
 Sparkadia - Talking Like I'm Falling Down Stairs
 Gotye - Eyes Wide Open
 Darwin Deez - Radar Detector 
 Illy Featuring Owl Eyes - It Can't Wait
 Yeasayer - O.N.E.
 The National - Bloodbuzz Ohio
 Tame Impala - Solitude Is Bliss
 The Naked and Famous - Punching in a Dream
 Chiddy Bang - Opposite of Adults
 Gorillaz Featuring Daley - Doncomatic
 John Butler Trio - Revolution
 Gyroscope - Baby, I'm Gettin' Better
 Yolanda Be Cool vs DCUP - We Speak No Americano
 Boy & Bear - Rabbit Song
 Bag Raiders - Way Back Home
 Hot Chip - One Life Stand
 The John Steel Singers - Overpass
 Miami Horror Featuring Alan Palamo - Holidays
 Vampire Weekend - Giving Up the Gun
 Arcade Fire - The Suburbs
 Hungry Kids of Hungary - Coming Around
 Big Boi Featuring Cutty - Shutterbugg
 Klaxons - Echoes
 Evil Eddie - Queensland
 The Bedroom Philosopher - Northcote (So Hungover)
 Angus & Julia Stone - Big Jet Plane (Live)

Trivia
 John Butler Trio score the #39 position for the second year in a row.
 Both members of Gnarls Barkley got a respective track in the list with different bands; Danger Mouse with Broken Bells and Cee-Lo Green with a solo track.
 Ian Kenny has now appeared in the Hottest 100 every year since 2005 with both Karnivool and Birds of Tokyo.
 Angus & Julia Stone are the first Australian band to win the Hottest 100 since Augie March in 2006.
 For a second year in a row a Triple J Unearthed artist has cracked the Top 10 (Art vs. Science #2 in 2009, and Little Red #2, Boy & Bear #5 and Art vs Science #9 in 2010).
 For the first time since 2005 no artist from France appeared in the list.
 Chiddy Bangs track samples the song Kids by MGMT which came #5 in the 2008 countdown.

References

2010 in Australian music
Australia Triple J
2010